The 2019–20 Mercyhurst Lakers men's ice hockey season was the 33rd season of play for the program, the 21st at the Division I level, and the 17th season in the Atlantic Hockey conference. The Lakers represented Mercyhurst University and were coached by Rick Gotkin, in his 32nd season.

Season
After starting with a split over ranked Arizona State, Mercyhurst played a decent few weeks, opening conference play with two split weekends, but after the Thanksgiving break, the team sank to the bottom of the standings. After starting 4–6 the team went 1–23–2 to finish with the worst record in program history. The 2019–20 Lakers had the fewest wins, most losses, lowest winning percentage, and worst goal differential in 33 seasons of play. Additionally, despite Atlantic Hockey changing their standings so that wins were worth 3 points rather than 2, the 11 points the team had in the standings was by far the fewest Mercyhurst has garnered since becoming a Division I program.

Departures

Recruiting

Roster
As of June 28, 2019.

Standings

Schedule and Results

|-
!colspan=12 style=";" | Regular Season

|-
!colspan=12 style=";" | 

|- align="center" bgcolor="#e0e0e0"
|colspan=12|Mercyhurst Lost Series 0–2

† Rescheduled from November 29.

Scoring Statistics

Goaltending statistics

Rankings

References

Mercyhurst Lakers men's ice hockey seasons
Mercyhurst Lakers
Mercyhurst Lakers
2019 in sports in Pennsylvania
2020 in sports in Pennsylvania